Compsolechia titanota is a moth of the family Gelechiidae. It was described by Walsingham in 1910. It is found in Guatemala.

The wingspan is about 13 mm. The forewings are ivory-white, the pale ground-colour fully exposed only along the costa from the base to two-thirds, and in a broad median band on which black shading and sprinkling of scales more or less encroaches from the base, and brownish fuscous shading, which covers the apical fourth, tends to encroach on its outer side. A small black dot at the extreme base of the costa is followed by two larger ones in the whitish space below the
costa. Resting on the upper edge of the black suffusion an indistinct ocelloid spot lies at the end of the cell, and beyond it a slender whitish line passes somewhat obliquely through the brownish terminal suffusion from the costa to the tornus, with two or three small whitish length-streaks, combined with some black
scales, running outward beyond it toward the termen and apex. There is a slender blackish line along the base of the tawny brown cilia. The hindwings are dark tawny brown.

References

Moths described in 1910
Compsolechia